A social media surgery is a gathering at which volunteer "surgeons" with expertise in using web tools, chiefly social media, offer free advice in using such tools, to representatives ("patients") of non-profit organisations, charities, community groups and activists, with "no boring speeches or jargon".

The idea was conceived by Pete Ashton, with Nick Booth of Podnosh Ltd, who ran the first such surgery in Birmingham, England, on 15 October 2008.

In July 2009, a spin-off surgery (dubbed the "Social media mob") started in Mosman, Australia, and in January 2010, the first spin-off surgery in Africa was held.

On 16 February 2012, it was announced that the Social Media Surgery movement had won "the Prime Minister’s Big Society Award".

Prime Minister David Cameron said:

The scheme also won the 2013 Adult Learners' Week "BBC Learning Through Technology Award".

References 

History of Birmingham, West Midlands
Computer-related introductions in 2008
Social media
David Cameron